Tum Ho Wajah is a Pakistani romantic-revenge drama television series premiered on Hum TV on 20 April 2020. It is written by Samina Ijaz, developed by Shahzad Javed, Head of Content, HUM TV, Directed by Saima Waseem and Produced by Momina Duraid under MD Productions, the series starring  Savera Nadeem, Shahood Alvi, Sumbul Iqbal, Saboor Aly, Ali Abbas and Shehzad Sheikh is an intense story of love and revenge.

Cast 

 Savera Nadeem as Sehba (Chanda's Mother) 
 Shahood Alvi as Mansoor 
 Sumbul Iqbal as Chanda
 Shehzad Sheikh as Shahaab
 Saboor Aly as Sitara
 Ali Abbas as Babar
 Kashif Mehmood as Muraad
 Raza Talish as Danish
 Salma Hassan as Tara
 Noor Ul Hassan as Ghafoor
 Shehzeen Rahat as Iram 
 Shermeen Ali as Sanna 
 Kaiser Khan as Wajid

Production

Promotion
It was revealed in September 2019 that Sumbul Iqbal and Shehzad Sheikh will be paired in a project and title was also announced. The first teaser was launched by Hum TV on 25 March 2020. The official teaser 2 was launched by Hum TV on 25 March 2020. The official teaser 3 was launched by Hum TV on 2 April 2020 revealed that the serial would release on 20 April 2020.

The teaser of OST was released on 11 April 2020. The OST is sung by Faiza Mujahid and Waqar Ali, whereas lyrics are by Sabir Zafar.

Broadcast
Tum Hi Wajah aired a weekly episode on Mondays succeeding Daasi starting from its premiere date. Later, the serial was shifted to 9pm slot on Fridays by replacing Mehboob Aapke Qadmon Main and make way for newly launched Mushk.

Episodes

Soundtrack

The OST is composed by Waqar Ali on lyrics of Sabir Zafar and sung by Faiza Mujahid and Waqar Ali.

See also 

 List of programs broadcast by Hum TV

References

External links
 Official website

Hum TV original programming
2020 Pakistani television series debuts
Pakistani drama television series
Urdu-language television shows
MD Productions
Television series by MD Productions
Television series created by Momina Duraid
Pakistani television series endings
2020 Pakistani television series endings